Chiquiacocha (possibly from Quechua chiqlla green, qucha lake, "green lake") is a lake in Peru located in the Junín Region, Junín Province, Junín District. Chiquiacocha lies east of Lake Junin and south of the lake Alcacocha.

References 

Lakes of Peru
Lakes of Junín Region